Overcoats is a New York based indie pop duo consisting of singer-songwriters Hana Elion and JJ Mitchell. Their debut album, YOUNG, was released on April 21, 2017 through Arts & Crafts Productions. Their second full length record, The Fight, came out March 6th, 2020 on Loma Vista Recordings. On June 4th 2021 they released an EP, Used To Be Scared Of The Dark, featuring collaborations with Middle Kids and Tennis (also out on Loma Vista Recordings).

Biography

Background 
Elion was born in New York but grew up in Washington, DC, spending time in Jamaica, Uganda, and Belize in her younger years. Mitchell was born in London but grew up in New York, England, and Egypt. The two ended up crossing paths in 2011 at Wesleyan University, a liberal arts college in Middletown, Connecticut. Elion and Mitchell were immediately drawn to each other when they first met, finding connection in their, "diverse love of music". Both halves of Overcoats describe the first time hearing each other sing as an, "epiphany, with the harmony of their combined voices leading to personal and individual discoveries."

Musical style and influences 
Overcoats list The Chicks, Simon & Garfunkel and Kacey Musgraves as some of their influences. They take inspiration from the harmonies of folk music while melding sonic backdrops of electronic, pop, and americana.”

YOUNG 
After releasing their self-titled EP Overcoats in 2015, Elion and Mitchell began working on a follow-up project and enlisted producers such as Nicolas Vernhes (Daughter, The War On Drugs, Dirty Projectors) and experimental R&B artist Autre Ne Veut. Released on April 21, 2017, YOUNG has received favorable reviews. NPR called YOUNG, "One of the best albums of 2017" and praised the duo's passion and ambition, stating, " Overcoats' Young is a record driven by ambition and passion, not craft. That's not to say Hana Elion and JJ Mitchell aren't terrifically talented singers and songwriters: What sets them apart is that I believe them. That the emotion in their harmonies and the space they give each other is filled with compassion. I believe their songs of loneliness and doubt."

The Fool 
On September 4, 2019, the duo released a new single called ‘The Fool.’  In the accompanying promotional video, the duo shave their heads. Hana and JJ provided the accompanying statement with the video:
 

Produced by Justin Raisen and Yves Rothman, The Fight has been described as a “ten-song battle cry.” Despite more of a rock & roll grittiness to the sound, two voices singing in harmony is still at the core of The Fight.

Used To Be Scared Of The Dark
Enlisting the help of their friends, Overcoats made a 4 track EP consisting of collaborations with Tennis, Middle Kids, Lawrence Rothman, and Local Natives.

Horsegirl
In November of 2022, Overcoats released “Horsegirl,” a country-tinged indie pop song, their first with distribution company Thirty Tigers.

Touring history
The band toured their first album in North America and parts of Europe from 2017-2018. In addition to headline touring, Overcoats has toured opening for  Mitski, Maggie Rogers, Cold War Kids, Tennis and Japanese House.

Discography

Albums 
 Overcoats (EP) (2015)
 YOUNG (2017)
 The Fight (2020)
 Used to be Scared of the Dark (EP) (2021)
 ''The Fight (Remixed/Extended) (2021)

References

American pop music groups
Female musical duos
Electronic music duos